MN 18 is an indazole-based synthetic cannabinoid that is an agonist for the cannabinoid receptors, with Ki values of 45.72 nM at CB1 and 11.098 nM at CB2 and EC50 values of 2.028 nM at CB1 and 1.233 nM at CB2, and has been sold online as a designer drug. It is the indazole core analogue of NNE1. Given the known metabolic liberation (and presence as an impurity) of amantadine in the related compound APINACA, it is suspected that metabolic hydrolysis of the amide group of MN-18 may release 1-naphthylamine, a known carcinogen. MN-18 metabolism has been described in literature.

Legal status
MN-18 is banned in Sweden.
On 15 September 2014 the Turkey government banned the sale of MN-18.

See also 

 5F-NNE1
 5F-PB-22
 AM-2201
 BB-22
 FUB-JWH-018
 AB-FUBINACA
 ADB-FUBINACA
 AMB-FUBINACA
 FDU-PB-22
 FUB-144
 FUB-APINACA
 FUB-PB-22
 MDMB-FUBICA
 MDMB-FUBINACA
 PB-22

References 

Cannabinoids
Designer drugs
Indazolecarboxamides
Naphthoylindazoles